The 2013–14 Armenian Cup is the 23rd season of Armenia's football knockout competition. It featured the eight 2013–14 Premier League teams, but no team from the 2013–14 First Division. The tournament began on 18 September 2013, with Pyunik the defending champions, having won their fifth title the previous season.

Results

Quarter-finals
All eight Premier League clubs competed in this round. The first legs were played on 18 September and 2 October 2013, while the second legs were played on 23 October and 6 November 2013.

|}

Semi-finals
The four winners from the quarterfinals entered this round. The first legs were played on 18 and 19 March 2014, with the second legs completed on 15 and 16 April 2014.

|}

Final

References

Armenian Cup seasons
Armenian Cup
Cup